Birdtown is a neighborhood near Cleveland, Ohio, United States.

Birdtown or Bird town may also refer to:

 Birdtown, Arkansas, a community in Arkansas, U.S.
 Bird Town, an American racehorse and broodmare
 "Birdtown," a municipal conservation program often organized by state Audubon societies
 Robbinsdale, Minnesota, given the nickname "Birdtown" by its residents